Stefan Živković (born 1 June 1990) is a Serbian football defender who plays as a left back for Turan in the Kazakh Premier League.

Career
Born in Kruševac, Živković passed the youth school of Red Star Belgrade. Later he was with Resnik and Hajduk Beograd. Živković joined Borac Čačak in the winter break off-season 2011–12. He made 13 SuperLiga appearances with 10 starts, and also played one cup match until the end of his debut season in club. Živković also played one semi-final cup match, in win against Vojvodina. For the next season, Borac was relegated to the Serbian First League. For two seasons Borac spent in the First League, Živković made 38 league and 4 cup matches and scored 2 goals for the 2012–13 period, but he missed the spring half of 2013–14 season. After Borac promoted to the SuperLiga, Živković contributed with 2 goal on 24 matches to survive in league, after the 2014–15 season. For the 2015–16 season, new coach, Nenad Lalatović gave a captain armband to Živković. During the first half of season, Živković played all 22 league matches and scored 1 goal against Voždovac, from penalty kick. He was also a member of 1 cup match, and will be remain as the leader of the generation that caused one of the worst defeats of Red Star Belgrade on the Rajko Mitić Stadium. He sued the club together with Nemanja Miletić and Dušan Jovančić ending of November 2015, over unpaid wages. Živković joined FK Čukarički beginning of 2016.

On 10 January 2018, Živković signed for FC Atyrau.

Career statistics

Notes & References

External links
 Stefan Živković stats at utakmica.rs 
 
 

1990 births
Living people
Sportspeople from Kruševac
Association football defenders
Serbian footballers
Serbia youth international footballers
Serbian expatriate footballers
FK Resnik players
FK Hajduk Beograd players
FK Borac Čačak players
FK Čukarički players
FK Zemun players
FC Zhetysu players
FC Turan players
Athlitiki Enosi Larissa F.C. players
Serbian First League players
Serbian SuperLiga players
Super League Greece players
Expatriate footballers in Greece